Sandra Lindsay may refer to:

 Sandra Lindsay, a victim of serial killer Gary M. Heidnik
 Sandra Lindsay, the first recipient of the COVID-19 vaccine in the United States